Vincent Gillespie,  FEA (born February 11, 1954) is Emeritus J. R. R. Tolkien Professor of English Literature and Language at the University of Oxford.  He was editor of the Exeter Medieval Texts and Studies Series from 2002 until 2023, and is the Honorary Director of the Early English Text Society, having previously served as its executive secretary. His major research area is late medieval English literature. He has published over sixty articles and book chapters ranging from medieval book history, through Geoffrey Chaucer and William Langland, to the medieval mystics such as Richard Rolle and, most recently, Julian of Norwich. He has a special interest in the medieval English Carthusians, and in Syon Abbey, the only English house of the Birgittine order (founded 1415). In 2001, he published Syon Abbey, Corpus of British Medieval Library Catalogues 9, an edition and analysis of the late-medieval library registrum of the Birgittine brethren of Syon Abbey.  He is the author of Looking in Holy Books, and the forthcoming A Short History of Medieval English Mysticism. He is the co-editor, with Kantik Ghosh, of After Arundel: Religious Writing in Fifteenth-Century England, with Susan Powell of A Companion to the Early Printed Book in Britain, 1476-1558, with Samuel Fanous of The Cambridge Companion to Medieval English Mysticism, and with Anne Hudson of Probable Truth: Editing Medieval Texts from Britain in the Twenty-First Century.

He was born in Liverpool, and educated at St Edward's College. After undergraduate and graduate study at Keble College, Oxford, he lectured at the University of Reading from 1977 to 1980. He was a tutorial fellow of St Anne's College, Oxford, from 1980 to 2004, and moved to a professorial fellowship of Lady Margaret Hall in 2004 on his election as the third Tolkien Professor (in succession to Douglas Gray and Paul Strohm). He retired from the chair in September 2021, becoming emeritus professor.

In 2003 he was elected a Fellow of the Royal Historical Society (FRHistS). He is also a Fellow of the Society of Antiquaries of London, and a Fellow of the English Association. In 2013 he was elected a Fellow of the British Academy (FBA). He is an honorary fellow of St Anne's College and Keble College Oxford, and a senior research fellow of Campion Hall, Oxford.

References

External links
Vincent Gillespie's Faculty Profile

1954 births
Living people
British medievalists
British philologists
Fellows of the British Academy
Fellows of Lady Margaret Hall, Oxford
Fellows of Campion Hall, Oxford
Fellows of the Royal Historical Society
Fellows of the Society of Antiquaries of London
Fellows of the English Association